Anja Čarman (born March 22, 1985) is a Slovenian swimmer. She won several medals at European LC and SC Championships and competed at 2004, 2008 and 2012 Summer Olympics. Anja is an alumnus of swimming powerhouse The Bolles School.

References 

Living people
1985 births
Female backstroke swimmers
Slovenian female freestyle swimmers
Slovenian female swimmers
Olympic swimmers of Slovenia
Swimmers at the 2004 Summer Olympics
Swimmers at the 2008 Summer Olympics
Swimmers at the 2012 Summer Olympics
People from Škofja Loka
European Aquatics Championships medalists in swimming
Mediterranean Games gold medalists for Slovenia
Swimmers at the 2001 Mediterranean Games
Mediterranean Games medalists in swimming